Krakatau Steel Stadium is a multi-purpose stadium in Cilegon, Banten, Indonesia. It is mostly used for football matches and is the home stadium of RANS Cilegon, Persic Cilegon and Persigon Cilegon.

References

cilegon
Buildings and structures in Banten
Multi-purpose stadiums in Indonesia
Football venues in Indonesia